Dragan Adžić (born 13 December 1969) is a Montenegrin handball coach of Krim and the Slovenia women's team.

He led Montenegro at the 2011 World Women's Handball Championship in Brazil. With the team, he won silver medal at the 2012 Summer Olympics.

Honours
Montenegro
2012 Olympic Games London – 2nd place
European Championship 2012 – 1st place

ŽRK Budućnost Podgorica
EHF Champions League: 2012, 2015
EHF Cup Winners' Cup: 2010
Montenegrin League: 2010, 2011, 2012, 2013, 2014, 2015, 2016, 2017, 2018, 2019
Montenegrin Cup: 2010, 2011, 2012, 2013, 2014, 2015, 2016, 2017, 2018, 2019
Women's Regional Handball League: 2010, 2011, 2012, 2013, 2014, 2015, 2016, 2019

References

1969 births
Living people
People from Berane
Montenegrin handball coaches
Handball coaches of international teams
Montenegrin expatriate sportspeople in Slovenia